The Cornélie was a 40-gun  of the French Navy.

On 4 August 1803 Cornélie sortied from Toulon as part of a squadron of four frigates and some corvettes. Cornélie captured the schooner  and the water transport that Redbreast was escorting from Malta to Admiral Nelson's fleet.

She took part in the Battle of Cape Finisterre and in the Battle of Trafalgar.

On 14 June 1808, The Spanish captured a French squadron at Cádiz that included Cornélie. The Spaniards then brought her into Spanish service as Cornelia.

References 
 Dictionnaire de la flotte de guerre française, Jean-Michel Roche.

Virginie-class frigates
1797 ships
Ships built in France